Tōsaka (written: 遠坂) is a Japanese surname.

Fictional characters
Rin Tōsaka, Fate/stay night
Tokiomi Tōsaka, Fate/zero

See also
Tosaka

Japanese-language surnames